Quiddelbach is a municipality in the district of Ahrweiler, in Rhineland-Palatinate, Germany. It is located within the Nürburgring Nordschleife racing circuit.

References 

Ahrweiler (district)